Smoothelin is a protein that in humans is encoded by the SMTN gene.

This gene encodes a structural protein that is found exclusively in contractile smooth muscle cells. It associates with stress fibers and constitutes part of the cytoskeleton. This gene is localized to chromosome 22q12.3, distal to the TUPLE1 locus and outside the DiGeorge syndrome deletion. Alternative splicing of this gene results in three transcript variants.

References

Further reading